Johnny Crash was an American heavy metal band, formed in 1985. Members originally included former Tokyo Blade singer Vick Wright (Vicki James Wright), former Champaign guitarists Christopher Stewart and August Worchell, bassist Andy Rogers, and former Rock City Angels drummer Stephen "Punkee" Adamo.

Their sound was likened to that of AC/DC, and contemporaries Junkyard, Rhino Bucket and The Four Horsemen. In 1990, the band released their first album, Neighbourhood Threat, featuring Vicki James Wright (vocals), August Worchell (guitar and backing vocals), Christopher Stewart (guitar and backing vocals), Stephen "Punky" Adamo (drums) and Terry Nails (bass). The band, with Andy Rogers on bass, toured for a short time with bands such as Mötley Crüe and Pretty Maids. The single "Hey Kid" became a minor hit and its video received some rotation on MTV.

Guitarist J.J. Bolt and then-future Guns N' Roses members Dizzy Reed and Matt Sorum joined the band to replace Worchell and Adamo. However, before the second album could be released Johnny Crash were dropped by their record label, and Stewart suggested moving to Europe. James Wright disagreed and the band split up.

In 1992, bassist Andy Rogers died of a heroin overdose.

In 2007, an interview with Vicki James Wright stated that the then unreleased album, now titled Unfinished Business, will come out on Suncity Records sometime "soon". In 2008, Unfinished Business was released on Suncity Records.

Vicki James Wright has since gone back to his original name, Vick Wright. He released his first novel titled South of the Pole in 2007.

Members
 Christopher Stewart - rhythm guitar, backing vocals (1985-1992)
 Vicki James "Vick" Wright - lead vocals (1985-1992)
 Stephen "Punkee" Adamo - drums (1985–1991)
 August Worchell - lead guitar, backing vocals (1985-1991)
 Terry Nails - bass guitar (1985-1990)
 Andy Rogers - bass guitar (1990-1992; died 1992)
 J.J. Bolt - lead guitar, backing vocals (1991-1992)
 Bobby "Spanky" Wilson- drums (1992)
 Dizzy Reed - keyboards, guitar (1991-1992)
 Matt Sorum - drums (1991-1992)

Recent
In 2010, Vic Wright wrote and directed the short film entitled White Trash Noir produced by Vick Wright's boutique film company, Vicktory Films. He won the "Best Director for a short or feature" award for White Trash Noir at the AOF Festival in Pasadena, California in 2011 and the award for "Best Horror Film" at the Action On Film International Film Festival 2013 for his first feature film, To Hell With A Bullet.

To Hell With A Bullet is a low budget feature film released in 2014. The film is about a washed-up rock singer who makes a deal with a mysterious doctor who promises to return his voice to its prime, with horrifying consequences. Wright is influenced in this production by the late, Rod Serling (Twilight Zone, Night Gallery) along with a modern take on Roald Dahl's Tales of the Unexpected.

The next production for his film company will be the feature-length version of White Trash Noir, which is scheduled to go into pre-production sometime in 2014. I'm guessing nobody has eyes on this production anymore.

Discography
Neighbourhood Threat (1990)
Unfinished Business (2008)

References

External links
   Myspace page
   Vicki James Wright Interview
   Christopher Stewart Interview
   August Worchell Interview

Glam metal musical groups from California
Musical groups established in 1987
Musical groups from Los Angeles